Ivanovskoye District  is an administrative district (raion) of Eastern Administrative Okrug, and one of the 125 raions of Moscow, Russia.

See also
Administrative divisions of Moscow

References

Notes

Districts of Moscow
Eastern Administrative Okrug